Bucculatrix recognita is a moth in the family Bucculatricidae. It was described by Annette Frances Braun in 1963 and is found in North America, where it has been recorded from Ontario, Maine, New Hampshire, Massachusetts, Missouri, New Jersey, Washington, D.C., North Carolina and South Carolina.

The wingspan is 6-7.5 mm. The forewings are yellow to orange-ocherous, the scales tipped with dark brown. The hindwings are yellowish white to pale silvery grey. Adults have been recorded on wing from August to October.

The larvae feed on Quercus macrocarpa. They mine the leaves of their host plant. Pupation takes place in a pale yellow cocoon.

References

Natural History Museum Lepidoptera generic names catalog

Bucculatricidae
Moths described in 1963
Moths of North America
Taxa named by Annette Frances Braun